Babushka or baboushka or babooshka (from , meaning "grandmother" or "elderly woman") may refer to:

Arts and media 
 "Babooshka" (song), a 1980 song by Kate Bush
 "Babushka Boi" (song), a 2019 song by A$AP Rocky
 Babushka (game show), a British game show presented by Rylan Clark-Neal
 Baboushka and the Three Kings, a children's picture book, by Ruth Robbins
 Buranovskiye Babushki, an ethno-pop band containing eight elderly women from Buranovo, Udmurtia, Russia
Babushka (about 1935), a painting by Gladys Goldstein

People
 Babushka Lady, an unknown woman who might have photographed the events of the President John F. Kennedy assassination
 Catherine Breshkovsky nicknamed Babushka (1844-1934), Russian revolutionary

Other uses
Babushka (headscarf), indicating a headscarf tied below the chin, as commonly worn in rural parts of Europe
Babushka doll, a type of wooden dolls placed one inside another
Babushka Adoption Foundation, a charitable non-governmental organization based in Bishkek, Kyrgyzstan

See also 
 
 Babuška (disambiguation)